Colin John James Robbins (born 5 February 1905) was a South African tennis player.

Robbins, a native of Natal, was the son of Bristol-born William Clark Robbins.

An attorney by profession, Robbins was a two-time national champion who competed for the South Africa Davis Cup team in 1929 and 1933, winning four singles rubbers. In those years he also featured at the Wimbledon Championships and made the third round in 1933. He reached the fourth round of the 1933 French Championships, where he was beaten in five sets by Jiro Sato.

Robbins, who played left-handed, was affectionately referred to as the robot of the South African team for his tireless play and ball retrieval abilities.

His wife was tennis player Billie Tapscott.

See also
List of South Africa Davis Cup team representatives

References

External links
 
 
 

1905 births
Year of death missing
South African male tennis players
Sportspeople from Durban
South African people of English descent